We Won't Grow Old Together is a 1972 French drama film directed by Maurice Pialat. Starring Marlène Jobert, Jean Yanne, and Macha Méril, the film is based on a novel of the same name by Pialat. It recounts the end of an affair between a married man who will not leave his wife and a spirited young woman who in the end breaks free. At the 1972 Cannes Film Festival, Jean Yanne won the award for Best Actor.

Plot
For six years Jean has been having an affair with Catherine. At the beginning she hoped he would divorce his wife and marry her. But disillusion with the lack of progress in his life and in their relationship, together with growing despair at the waste of her life, has set in. She meets a divorced man with a good job who likes foreign travel, and agrees to marry him. Her family, who supported her through her deepening unhappiness, are delighted. Her rival gone, Jean's wife hints at reconciliation.

Cast
 Marlène Jobert as Catherine
 Jean Yanne as Jean
 Macha Méril as Françoise
 Harry-Max as Jean's father
 Christine Fabréga as Catherine's mother
 Jacques Galland as Catherine's father
 Patricia Pierangeli as Annie
 Maurice Risch as Michel

References

External links

1972 drama films
1972 films
Films directed by Maurice Pialat
French drama films
1970s French-language films
1970s French films